Vasil Tachev (born 7 January 1992) is a Bulgarian footballer who plays as a striker for Oborishte Panagyurishte.

Career
During the 2012–13 season, Tachev scored 18 goals in the North-East V AFG, the third division of Bulgarian football.

On 2 July 2017, Tachev joined Belasitsa Petrich but signed with Kariana a few weeks later.

References

External links
 

1992 births
Living people
Sportspeople from Varna, Bulgaria
Bulgarian footballers
Association football forwards
PFC Cherno More Varna players
PFC Dobrudzha Dobrich players
FC Chernomorets Balchik players
FC Sozopol players
FC Oborishte players
PFC Belasitsa Petrich players
First Professional Football League (Bulgaria) players
Second Professional Football League (Bulgaria) players